Corey Jermaine Thomas (born June 6, 1975) is a former professional American football wide receiver, who played in one game for the Detroit Lions in 1998. He played college football at Duke.

References

1975 births
Living people
People from Wilson, North Carolina
American football wide receivers
Detroit Lions players
Duke Blue Devils football players
Frankfurt Galaxy players
Players of American football from North Carolina